Osman Bazar or Osmanbazar may refer to:
 Osmanbazar, Chabahar
 Osman Bazar, Polan, Chabahar County
 Osman Bazar, alternate name of Bajar Bazar, Chabahar County